Thomas, Tom Stevens or Thomas, Tom Stephens may refer to:

Military
Thomas Holdup Stevens (1795–1841), American naval commander in the War of 1812
Thomas H. Stevens Jr. (1819–1896), admiral of the United States Navy who fought in the American Civil War

Politicians
Thomas Stevens (MP for Gloucester), MP for Gloucester, 1420–1442
Thomas G. Stephens (1818–?), Wisconsin legislator
Thomas Blacket Stephens (1819–1877), mayor of Brisbane
Thomas Jordan Stevens (1848–1900), member of the Utah State legislature
Thomas E. Stephens (politician) (1904–1988), American politician
Tom Stephens (born 1951), Australian politician, member of the Parliament of Western Australia 1982 to 2013
Tom Stevens (Objectivist Party politician) (1956–2019), American politician, 2008 and 2012 presidential nominee of the Objectivist Party
Tom Stevens (Vermont politician), member of the Vermont House of Representatives

Religion
Thomas Stevens (monk) (c. 1490–1550), abbot of Netley Abbey and Beaulieu Abbey, English renaissance clergyman and Cistercian monk
Thomas Stephens (Jesuit) (c. 1549–1619), early writer in Konkani
Thomas Stevens (bishop) (1841–1920), inaugural bishop of Barking

Sports
Thomas Stevens (cyclist) (1854–1935), first man to cycle around the world
Thomas Stephens (American football) (1935–2018), professional American football player
Thomas Stephens (boxer) (born 1969), Liberian Olympic boxer

Others
Thomas Stephens Davies (c. 1794–1851), British mathematician
Thomas Stevens (c. 1800–?), the founder of Bradfield College
Thomas Stephens (historian) (1821–1875), Welsh historian
Thomas Stevens (weaver) (1828–1888), English silk weaver
Thomas Stephens (educationist) (1830–1913), school inspector and university vice-chancellor in colonial Australia
Thomas E. Stephens (artist) (1884–1966), Welsh-born portrait painter
Thomas Stevens Stevens (1900–2000), Scottish organic chemist
Terry-Thomas or Thomas Stevens (1911–1990), English comedian and character actor
Thomas Stevens (trumpeter) (1938–2018), American trumpeter, composer, and author
Tom Stevens (actor) (born 1987), Canadian actor, producer, and musician
Tom Stevens (musician) (born 1956), American bassist, guitarist, singer, and songwriter